Heinrich Gotho (May 3, 1872 – August 28, 1938) was an Austrian film actor. Born in Dolina (now in Ukraine),  he started his acting career at some provincial theatres until he found an engagement at the Neues Volkstheater in Berlin. The character actor appeared in over 50 films between 1922 and 1933, mostly in smaller roles. He notably appeared in numerous films by director Fritz Lang, among them Dr. Mabuse the Gambler (1922), Metropolis (1927) and M (1931). Gotho was forced to retire from film acting in 1933; as a Jew he could no longer work in Nazi Germany. He died in 1938 in the Jewish Hospital of Berlin-Wedding.

Partial filmography

 Die Mauritiusmarke (1912)
 Dr. Mabuse the Gambler (1922) - (uncredited)
 The Stowaway (1922)
 The False Dimitri (1922) - Schamanenzauberer
 Princess Suwarin (1923)
 Schatten – Eine nächtliche Halluzination (1923) - Violinist (uncredited)
 Man Against Man (1924)
 The Tower of Silence (1924) - porter at Aviation Society (uncredited)
 The Gentleman Without a Residence (1925) - zweiter Professor
 Mit dem Auto ins Morgenland (1926) - Redakteur
 Metropolis (1927) - Zermonienmeister - Master of Ceremonies (uncredited)
 The Imaginary Baron (1927) - Gast im Hause
 His Late Excellency (1927) - Hofcharge
 Grand Hotel (1927)
 Weekend Magic (1927) - Der Eisverkäufer
 Die raffinierteste Frau Berlins (1927) - Der Kompagnon
 The Love of Jeanne Ney (1927) - Man in Train
 The Merry Vineyard (1927) - Rindsfuß, Weinhändler
 Die 3 Niemandskinder (1927) - Hofmarschall
 Moral (1928)
 The Duty to Remain Silent (1928) - Der Diener
 The Beaver Coat (1928) - Mittendorf
 Spione (1928) - Burton Jason's Other Assistant (uncredited)
 Love's Masquerade (1928)
 The Shop Prince (1928)
 The Insurmountable (1928)
 The Saint and Her Fool (1928) - Märt
 Volga Volga (1928)
 Accident (1928, Short)
 The Age of Seventeen (1929)
 My Heart is a Jazz Band (1929) - Reggie
 What a Woman Dreams of in Springtime (1929)
 Yes, Yes, Women Are My Weakness (1929)
 Come Back, All Is Forgiven (1929)
 The Ship of Lost Souls (1929) - Ein Matrose - A Sailor
 Woman in the Moon (1929) - Der Mieter vom II. Stock
 Wenn Du noch eine Heimat hast (1930)
 Rooms to Let (1930) - Herr Piefke
 Menschen im Feuer (1930)
 Police Spy 77 (1930)
 Love in the Ring (1930)
 Das Mädel aus U.S.A. (1930)
 Liebeskleeblatt (1930)
 Dance Into Happiness (1930) - Oskar Hübner, Briefträger
 The Forester's Daughter (1931) - Ein Notar
 Mary (1931)
 M (1931) - passer-by who tells a kid the time (uncredited)
 Das Millionentestament (1932)
 Laughing Heirs (1933) - Verwandter bei der Testamentseröffnung (uncredited)
 The Testament of Dr. Mabuse (1933)
 Schüsse an der Grenze (1933)
 Ein Unsichtbarer geht durch die Stadt (1933) - Schalterbeamter an der Pferderennbahn

References

Bibliography
 Waldman, Harry. Maurice Tourneur: The Life and Films. McFarland, 2001.

External links

1872 births
1938 deaths
Austrian male film actors
Austrian male silent film actors
20th-century Austrian male actors
People from the Kingdom of Galicia and Lodomeria
Jews from Galicia (Eastern Europe)
Austro-Hungarian Jews
Austro-Hungarian emigrants to Germany
People from Dolyna

Births in Dolyna